Adnet is a surname. Notable people with the surname include:

Françoise Adnet (born 1924), French painter
Jacques Adnet (1901–1984), French designer and architect
Marcelo Adnet (born 1981), Brazilian actor, comedian, and VJ

French-language surnames